Gribanovsky is an urban locality (an urban-type settlement) and the administrative center of Gribanovsky District of Voronezh Oblast, Russia. Population:

History
It was founded in 1703 as the village of Bolshaya Gribanovka in the Tambov district, and later the village was a part of Borisoglebsky Uyezd of Tambov Governorate. In 1728 it was owned by Prince Menshikov. At the end of the 18th century the wooden Epiphany Church was built, and in 1899 it was rebuilt into a stone church. In 1860, a sugar factory was built near the village. In 1869 a railway station was built. Since 1957 Gribanovkahas held the status of urban-type settlement.

References

Urban-type settlements in Voronezh Oblast
Populated places in Gribanovsky District
Borisoglebsky Uyezd (Tambov Governorate)